The 1959 Wisconsin Badgers football team was an American football team that represented the University of Wisconsin in the 1959 Big Ten Conference football season. In its fourth season under head coach Milt Bruhn, Wisconsin compiled a 7–3 record (5–2 in Big Ten, first), won the Big Ten championship, but lost to underdog Washington in the Rose Bowl on New Year's Day.

Schedule

Roster

NFL Draft
Five Badgers were selected in the 1960 NFL Draft

References

Wisconsin
Wisconsin Badgers football seasons
Big Ten Conference football champion seasons
Wisconsin Badgers football